Hussein El Husseiny (born April 21, 1991) is an Egyptian professional footballer who currently plays as a defender for Al Nasr. In 2017, El Husseiny signed a 3-year contract for Al Nasr in a free transfer from Kafr El Sheikh.

References

1991 births
Living people
Al Nasr SC (Egypt) players
Egyptian footballers
Association football defenders
Wadi Degla SC players
Ghazl El Mahalla SC players